Chaj (also Romanized as Chāj) is a village in Baqeran Rural District, in the Central District of Birjand County, South Khorasan Province, Iran. At the 2006 census, its population was 357, in 124 families.

References 

Populated places in Birjand County